Vincent Harry Blatchford (1906–1976) was a male English international table tennis player.

Table tennis career
He was selected to represent England during the 1930 World Table Tennis Championships in the Swaythling Cup (men's team event).

The team consisting of H.C. Cooke, Bernard Hookins, Stanley Proffitt and Tommy Sears finished in sixth place.

See also
 List of England players at the World Team Table Tennis Championships
 List of World Table Tennis Championships medalists

References

1906 births
1976 deaths
English male table tennis players
People from Dulwich